Lynden High School (LHS) is a public high school in Lynden, Washington, United States. Lynden High School serves students in grades 9-12 for the Lynden School District.

Academics
In the 2020 U.S. News & World Report annual survey of high schools, Lynden ranked 162nd in Washington and 9,434th nationally.

Demographics
The demographic breakdown of the 931 students enrolled for 2018-19 was:
Male - 49.2%
Female - 50.8%
Native American/Alaskan - 0.2%
Asian - 2.0%
Black - 0.5%
Hispanic - 24.1%
Native Hawaiian/Pacific islanders - 0.3%
White - 66.5%
Multiracial - 6.4%
46.3% of the students were eligible for free or reduced-cost lunch.

Athletics
Lynden High School's teams are named the Lions, and the school colors are green and gold. Lynden offers the following Washington Interscholastic Activities Association (WIAA) sanctioned sports:

Baseball (boys) 
Basketball (girls and boys) 
Cheer
Cross country (girls and boys) 
Football (boys) 
Golf (girls and boys) 
Soccer (girls and boys) 
Softball (girls) 
Swimming (girls and boys) 
Tennis (girls and boys) 
Track and field (girls and boys) 
Volleyball (girls) 
Wrestling (girls and boys)

References

External links

Lynden, Washington
High schools in Whatcom County, Washington
Public high schools in Washington (state)